Perigonia caryae is a moth of the  family Sphingidae. It is known from the Dominican Republic.

It is the only species in the genus Perigonia with a banded forewing pattern consisting of alternating pale and dark brown areas, in combination with a semicircular submarginal area that is paler than the adjacent terminal area and which extends posteriorly only slightly beyond the middle of the outer margin and never approximates or reaches the tornus.

References

caryae
Moths of the Caribbean
Insects of the Dominican Republic
Endemic fauna of Hispaniola
Moths described in 1998